Karolina Jensen (born May 8, 2003) is a Danish female curler from Kastrup.

Personal life
As of 2020, Jensen is a student. Her mother is fellow curler Angelina Jensen and her aunt is Camilla Jensen.

Teams

Women's

Mixed

Mixed doubles

References

External links

Jensen, Karolina | Nordic Junior Curling Tour

Living people
2003 births
Danish female curlers

Curlers at the 2020 Winter Youth Olympics
Sportspeople from Copenhagen
People from Tårnby Municipality